The Philadelphia International Airport stations are a group of train stations serving Philadelphia International Airport's six terminals, serviced by SEPTA Regional Rail via the Airport Line.

Stations

Airport Terminal A & B
Airport Terminal A serves Gates A1–A26.
Airport Terminal B serves Gates B1–B16.

The Terminal A station is adjacent to Terminal B. Terminal A check-in is only accessible via an uncovered curbside walkway or a circuitous series of walkways. The station entered service in 1990, five years after the rest of the line, when Terminal A opened.

The stations for Terminal A and Terminal B share platforms on one side of the track. Trains stop at one end for Terminal A and the other end for Terminal B.

Airport Terminals C & D
Airport Terminal C serves Gates C17–C30.
Airport Terminal D serves Gates D1–D16.

Airport Terminals E & F
Airport Terminal E serves Gates E1–E17.
Airport Terminal F serves Gates F1–F39.

Each of the four stations is fully handicapped accessible, and is located next to the baggage claim at each terminal with escalator and elevator access from each terminal's skyway. Trains from the city arrive first at Terminal A, and terminate at Terminals E and F.

Although the airport is located less than 10 miles from the city's central business district, the stations are located in zone 4. 

A food court and shopping area exists between Terminals B and C. The Airport Marriott is located adjacent to Terminal B. No parking is available at any of the stations.

References

External links

SEPTA - Philadelphia International Airport Terminal A (East & West), Terminal B, Terminals C & D and Terminals E & F
SEPTA Discount Fares
Philadelphia International Airport Terminal Map; Flash version and Non-Flash version

Philadelphia Airport Terminals
Philadelphia
Railway stations in the United States opened in 1985
Stations on the Airport Line (SEPTA)
Philadelphia International Airport